Cross Bones is a disused post-medieval burial ground on Redcross Way in Southwark, south London. Up to 15,000 people are believed to have been buried there. It was closed in 1853.

Cross Bones is thought to have been established originally as an unconsecrated graveyard for prostitutes, or "single women", who were known locally as "Winchester Geese" because they were licensed by the Bishop of Winchester to work within the Liberty of the Clink. The area lay outside the jurisdiction of the City of London and as a consequence became known for its brothels and theatres, as well as bull and bear baiting, activities not permitted within the City itself. By 1769 it had become a pauper's cemetery servicing St. Saviour's parish.

History

Origins

John Stow, in his A Survey of London (1598), made mention of a "Single Woman's churchyard" in Southwark, near the Clink:

It was mentioned again in 1795 in a history of St. Saviour's, Southwark:

The antiquarian William Taylor wrote in 1833: “There is an unconsecrated burial ground known as the Cross Bones at the corner of Redcross Street, formerly called the Single Woman's burial ground, which is said to have been used for this purpose." By 1769 it was being used as a cemetery for the poor of St. Saviour's parish. Up to 15,000 people are believed to have been buried there.

Closure and sale
The graveyard was closed in 1853 because it was "completely overcharged with dead", and further burials were deemed "inconsistent with a due regard for the public health and public decency". According to Southwark writer John Constable, the land was sold as a building site in 1883, prompting an objection from Lord Brabazon in November that year in a letter to The Times, asking that it be saved from "such desecration". Constable writes that the sale was declared null and void the following year under the Disused Burial Grounds Act 1884, and that subsequent attempts to develop the site were opposed by local people, as was its brief use as a fairground. After removal of remains to the parish facilities in Brookwood Cemetery, Surrey, the site was covered in warehousing and other commercial buildings.

Plaque

In 2006 Southwark Council funded the erection of a brass plaque reading as follows:
Cross Bones Graveyard

In medieval times this was an unconsecrated graveyard for prostitutes or 'Winchester Geese'But by the 18th century it had become a paupers' burial ground, which closed in 1853.Here, local people have created a memorial shrine.

The Outcast DeadRIP

Excavation

Excavations were conducted on the land by the Museum of London Archaeology Service between 1991 and 1998 in connection with the construction of London Underground's Jubilee line. Southwark Council reports that the archaeologists found a highly overcrowded graveyard with bodies piled on top of one another. Tests showed those buried had suffered from smallpox, tuberculosis, Paget's disease, osteoarthritis, and vitamin D deficiency.

A dig in 1992 uncovered 148 graves, dating from between 1800 and 1853. Over one third of the bodies were perinatal (between 22 weeks gestation and seven days after birth), and a further 11 percent were under one year old. The adults were mostly women aged 36 and older.

Depictions in media
Beginning in 1996, John Constable began to publish The Southwark Mysteries, a series of poems and mystery plays. The work has been performed in Shakespeare's Globe and in Southwark Cathedral. Interest generated by The Southwark Mysteries inspired the Cross Bones Halloween festival, celebrated every year since 1998 with a procession, candles and songs.

In 2004, London writer and poet Frank Molloy wrote the verse "Big Daves Gusset" about the burial plot. The title refers to a piece of graffiti on the adjacent wall of a burnt-out shed. The poem was included in his 2020 book Soul City Wandering.

In August 2019, English singer-songwriter Frank Turner included a song about Cross Bones, called "The Graveyard of the Outcast Dead", on his album No Man's Land. Additionally, his podcast, Frank Turner's Tales From No Man's Land, includes an episode about the history of Cross Bones. Also in 2019 another English singer-songwriter, Reg Meuross, included the song "The Crossbones Graveyard" on his album "RAW".

An informal local group, Friends of Cross Bones, has campaigned for a permanent memorial garden.  The network liaised with Bankside Open Spaces Trust during 2013–18 to create and maintain a community garden of remembrance dedicated to the 'outcast dead'.  The current garden is a result of work of the Friends of Cross Bones over 20 years.  The graveyard gates are permanently decorated by a changing array of messages, ribbons, flowers and other tokens; a short memorial ceremony is held at the gates on the 23rd of each month in the early evening.

References

Further reading

 Cross Bones website
Brickley, Megan; Miles, Adrian; and Stainer, Hilary (1999). The Cross Bones Burial Ground, Redcross Way, Southwark, London. Museum of London Archeology Service. 
Ogden, A. R.; Pinhasi, R.; and White, W. J. (2007). "Gross enamel hypoplasia in molars from sub-adults in a 16th–18th century London graveyard". American Journal of Physical Anthropology.
Tucker, F. (8 November 2007). "Kill or Cure? The osteological evidence of the mercury treatment of syphilis in 17th to 19th-century London". London Archaeologist. 11(8), pp. 220–224.
 Audio slideshow: Cross Bones, BBC News.
Video montage and commentary, BBC News, 31 October 2010

17th-century establishments in England
1853 disestablishments in England
Buildings and structures in the London Borough of Southwark
Cemeteries in London
London Borough of Southwark
Prostitution in England
Tourist attractions in the London Borough of Southwark